Patrick O'Brien Demsey (born December 14, 1978) is an American actor.

Early life and education
Demsey was born in Danvers, Massachusetts. His parents are Gene and Gail Demsey; he has an older brother, Christopher, and a younger brother, Michael. He graduated from Danvers High School in 1997 and attended Fitchburg State College, playing hockey at both schools, but was forced to quit the sport due to injuries.

Career 
Demsey's acting career started with a successful casting call for the 2004 movie Miracle, in which he plays Mike Eruzione, the captain of the U.S. hockey team that defeated the Soviet Union's team in the 1980 Winter Olympics. To prepare for the movie, Demsey trained with the real Eruzione's hockey team.

After Miracle he moved to Sherman Oaks, California, to continue his acting career, but received only one major role opportunity, for the 2006 horror movie Big Bad Wolf, an offer he turned down. He returned to Danvers, worked in construction briefly, but returned to California to give acting another try. He received an offer to play a part in the movie Frail.

Filmography

Film

Television

External links

References 

Living people
People from Danvers, Massachusetts
American male film actors
Fitchburg State University alumni
Male actors from Massachusetts
1978 births